This article shows all participating team squads at the men's beach volleyball tournament at the 2008 Summer Olympics in Beijing.

Angola

Team Fernandes-Morais

Argentina

Team Conde-Baracetti

Australia

Team Schacht-Slack

Austria

Team Doppler-Gartmayer

Team Gosch-Horst

Brazil

Team Ricardo-Emanuel

Team Márcio Araújo-Fábio Luiz

China

Team Xu-Wu

Estonia

Team Kais-Vesik

Georgia

Team Geor-Gia

Germany

Team Brink-Dieckmann

Team Klemperer-Koreng

Italy

Team Lione-Amore

Japan

Team Asahi-Shiratori

Latvia

Team Samoilovs-Pļaviņš

Netherlands

Team Nummerdor-Schuil

Team Boersma-Ronnes

Norway

Team Kjemperud-Skarlund

Russia

Team Barsouk-Kolodinsky

Spain

Team Herrera-Mesa

Switzerland

Team Heyer-Heuscher

Team Laciga-Schnider

United States

Team Rogers-Dalhausser

Team Gibb-Rosenthal

See also
 Beach volleyball at the 2008 Summer Olympics – Women's team rosters

References

Beach volleyball player bios, FIVB
Beach Volleyball Database

2
2008
Volleyball at the 2008 Summer Olympics
Men's events at the 2008 Summer Olympics